Tero Linnainmaa (born 1992) is a Finnish orienteering, ski orienteering and mountain bike orienteering competitor.

He won a bronze medal in the long distance at the 2019 World Ski Orienteering Championships.

References

1992 births
Living people
Finnish orienteers
Ski-orienteers